Appetite for Extinction is an album by Some Velvet Sidewalk. It was released in 1990.

Critical reception
Trouser Press wrote that "between the epic grind of 'Snow' and the too-brief pop discourse of '20,000 Leagues', Some Velvet Sidewalk covers all of nerd-pop’s bases, getting thrown out only when they unplug on the insufferably twee 'Crayons'."

Track listing
"Seasons"
"Old Bridges"
"Dinosaur"
"Hurt."
"Sidewalkin'"
"Crayons"
"Snow."
"alright"
"Moment"
"Sidewalk and Sky"
"Old Bridges (Live)"
"20,000 Leagues"

References

Some Velvet Sidewalk albums
1990 albums